The Masters of Disaster is a 1986 American short documentary film produced by Sonya Friedman. It was nominated for an Academy Award for Best Documentary Short.

References

External links
The Masters of Disaster at the Indiana University Libraries Moving Image Archive 

1986 films
1986 short films
1986 documentary films
1986 independent films
American short documentary films
1980s short documentary films
American independent films
1980s English-language films
1980s American films